This is a comprehensive discography for Comedy Central Records, the record label of American cable channel Comedy Central.

2002

2003

2004

2005

2006

2007

2008

2009

2010

2011

2012

2013

2014

2015

2016

References 

Comedy Central
Discographies of American record labels